Martyanovo is a rural locality (a village) in Frolovskoye Rural Settlement, Permsky District, Perm Krai, Russia. The population was 34 as of 2010. There are 46 streets.

Geography 
Martyanovo is located 14 km southeast of Perm (the district's administrative centre) by road. Bolshaya Mos is the nearest rural locality.

References 

Rural localities in Permsky District